The Faculty of Civil Engineering is one of nine faculties at the RWTH Aachen University. It was founded in 1880 and produced several notable individuals like Philipp Forchheimer. Approximately 1,000 students are enrolled in the faculty.

Degrees awarded

The following Degrees are awarded in civil engineering and industrial engineering:

 Bachelor of Science
 Master of Science
 Diplom
 Doctor

External links
 Faculty of Civil Engineering (German version)

RWTH Aachen University